Cristian Lucian Cigan (born 15 May 1987) is a Romanian footballer who plays as a striker for Füzesgyarmat. In his career, Cigan also played for teams such as: Bihor Oradea, Dinamo București, Liberty Salonta, FC Sopron, Luceafărul Oradea or Szeged-Csanád, among others.

His father, Sorin Cigan was also a footballer.

References

External links
 
 

1987 births
Living people
Romanian footballers
Romania under-21 international footballers
Romania youth international footballers
Association football forwards
Liga I players
Liga II players
Nemzeti Bajnokság I players
FC Bihor Oradea players
FC Dinamo București players
CF Liberty Oradea players
FC Sopron players
A.S.D. Gallipoli Football 1909 players
A.S. Sambenedettese players
CS Gaz Metan Mediaș players
CS Luceafărul Oradea players
Szeged-Csanád Grosics Akadémia footballers
Romanian expatriate footballers
Expatriate footballers in Italy
Romanian expatriate sportspeople in Italy
Expatriate footballers in Hungary
Romanian expatriate sportspeople in Hungary
Expatriate footballers in Austria
Romanian expatriate sportspeople in Austria
Nemzeti Bajnokság III players
Sportspeople from Oradea